Grasse is a commune in France.

Grasse may also refer to:
 Arrondissement of Grasse, an arrondissement of France, located in the Alpes-Maritimes departement
 Grasse River, a river in northern New York
 Pierre-Paul Grassé, French zoologist

See also
 De Grasse (disambiguation)